The European Journal of Operational Research (EJOR) is a peer-reviewed academic journal in operations research. It was founded in 1977 by the Association of European Operational Research Societies, and is published by Elsevier, with Roman Słowiński as its Co-ordinating Editor. Currently, it publishes at a rate of 24 issues per annual volume, with approximately 250 pages per issue.

It is the primary journal for Europe-based studies of operations research, and is the world's largest operations research journal. For most years since 1999 it has been ranked by SCImago Journal Rank as a top-quartile journal in information systems and management, management science and operations research, and modeling and simulation.

References

Mathematics journals
Business and management journals
Publications established in 1977